The Honorary Goya Award (Spanish: Premio Goya de Honor) is one of the Goya Awards, Spain's principal national film awards. It is a non-competitive award and it is awarded for extraordinary distinction in lifetime achievement.

Honorees

1980s

1990s

2000s

2010s

2020s

Goya Awards